Michael Gaski is an American baseball executive, and former coach and player in college baseball. Since 2001, Gaski has served as president of the United States national baseball team.

Gaski played college baseball at the University of Detroit from 1970 to 1973. He was the head baseball coach at the University of North Carolina at Greensboro from 1991 to 2012; he was fired on May 25, 2012.

Head coaching records

References

External links
UNC Greensboro Spartans bio

Living people
Detroit Mercy Titans baseball players
Cleveland State Vikings baseball coaches
University of North Carolina at Greensboro alumni 
Ohio State Buckeyes baseball coaches
Florida Southern Moccasins baseball coaches
UNC Greensboro Spartans baseball coaches
Year of birth missing (living people)